Independence Estate (Osiedle Niepodległości) is in Bydgoszcz, Poland, and is the youngest district in Fordon. The first block of Wyzwolenia street was made available for use in June 1990.

References

Buildings and structures in Bydgoszcz
Neighbourhoods in Bydgoszcz